Perfect Entertainment was an independent British computer game developer, which ceased production in 1999. It began in 1991 as Teeny Weeny Games headed by Angela Sutherland but changed names when merging exclusively with Gregg Barnett's Perfect 10 Productions, a company previously known as Beam Software (UK).

Perfect Entertainment is notable for its popular point-and-click adventure games Discworld, Discworld II: Missing Presumed...!? and Discworld Noir, which are based on the Terry Pratchett novels. Teeny Weeny Games was the initial funding source of Perfect Entertainment's speculative product demo of Discworld. Perfect Entertainment produced the majority of Psygnosis games ported to the Sega Saturn, since Sony (who owned Psygnosis at that time) wasn't willing to fund games for a rival console.

Most of the assets, staff and risks of Perfect Entertainment were absorbed into what became Teeny Weeny Games' second incarnation in 1999 on the completion of the Discworld Noir. Partly due to a costly and protracted legal dispute with Psygnosis over unpaid royalties and fees which were eventually settled out of court and partly due to arguments at board level, it was decided to scale the company down to allow unhappy stakeholders to leave. Tantalus Entertainment (now Tantalus Media) in Melbourne, Australia was sold back to its original directors. In early 2000, Teeny Weeny Games was contracted by 20th Century Fox to supply "The World's Scariest Car Chases" on a $3,600,000 contract, a game already under development for over a year. The producer of this project and various other staff bought a majority shareholding and took over the company. Teeny Weeny Games closed a year later.

Court case 

Perfect Entertainment's shrinking and subsequent demise came largely due to the aforementioned court case with Psygnosis/Sony Entertainment. Originally it was believed Perfect had signed contracts for a multi-game deal with Sony, but issues arose when it was contested three of these games should have been Discworld titles. When negotiations broke down and Discworld's third title, Discworld Noir, was not offered to Sony, the court case ensued. While in development staff payments became late, the deadline for Noir was heavily rescheduled and staff began to leave amid fears of job security. By the time Discworld Noir was finished the development team was running at half the size it was when it began. Discworld Noir was eventually released by GT Interactive in 1999, it was the last game Perfect Entertainment developed that was to be published.

Games

Teeny Weeny Games
 1992: Predator 2 (Mega Drive/Genesis, Sega Master System, Game Gear)
 1992: The Incredible Crash Dummies (Game Gear)
 1992: Fire Fighter (Game Boy)
 1992: Xenon 2: Megablast (Game Boy)
 1993: WWF WrestleMania: Steel Cage Challenge (Game Gear)
 1993: Choplifter III (Game Gear, Game Boy)
 1993: Last Action Hero (NES)
 1993: The Simpsons: Bartman Meets Radioactive Man (Game Gear)
 1994: BloodNet (Amiga)
 1994: Fido Dido (Mega Drive/Genesis)
 1994: Wolverine: Adamantium Rage (Mega Drive/Genesis)
 1995: Pocahontas (GT Interactive DOS game)
 1995: Primal Rage (DOS)
 1995: Discworld (DOS, Macintosh, PlayStation)
 1996: Discworld (Sega Saturn)
 1996: Screamball: The Ultimate Pinball Challenge (U.S. Gold PC)

Perfect 10 Productions
 1995: Discworld (DOS, Macintosh, PlayStation)
 1996: Discworld (Sega Saturn)

Perfect Entertainment
 1996: Discworld II: Missing Presumed...!? (DOS, Windows)
 1996: Wipeout (Sega Saturn)
 1996: 3D Lemmings (Sega Saturn)
 1996: Destruction Derby (Sega Saturn)
 1997: FIFA 97 (Sega Saturn)
 1997: Krazy Ivan (Sega Saturn)
 1997: Wipeout 2097 (Sega Saturn)
 1997: Discworld II: Missing Presumed...!? (PlayStation, Sega Saturn)
 1997: Assault Rigs (Sega Saturn)
 1997: Adidas Power Soccer (unpublished Saturn version)
 1997: Adidas Power Soccer (Windows)
 1997: Destruction Derby 2 (unpublished Saturn version)
 1999: Discworld Noir (Windows)

Teeny Weeny Games (post-Perfect Entertainment)
 2000: Discworld Noir (PlayStation)
 2000: World's Scariest Police Chases: Deadly Pursuit (Dreamcast, cancelled)

References 

Defunct video game companies of the United Kingdom
Video game companies established in 1991
Video game companies disestablished in 1999
Video game development companies
Defunct companies based in London